Bulelani Alfred Ndengane (born 19 January 1987) is a South African professional soccer player who plays as a defender for Maritzburg United.

Early and personal life
Ndengane was born in Cape Town.

Career
Ndengane started his career at Hanover Park, and had spells at FC Cape Town and Bloemfontein Celtic, leaving the latter in 2018, before joining Orlando Pirates in January 2019. He was released by Orlando Pirates in October 2020.

Honours
Tshakhuma Tsha Madzivhandila FC
Nedbank Cup:2020-21

References

1987 births
Living people
South African soccer players
Soccer players from Cape Town
Association football defenders
Hanover Park F.C. players
F.C. Cape Town players
Bloemfontein Celtic F.C. players
Orlando Pirates F.C. players
Tshakhuma Tsha Madzivhandila F.C. players
Maritzburg United F.C. players
South African Premier Division players
National First Division players